Olenecamptus cretaceus is a species of beetle in the family Cerambycidae. It was described by Henry Walter Bates in 1873.

Subspecies
 Olenecamptus cretaceus cretaceus Bates, 1873
 Olenecamptus cretaceus marginatus Schwarzer, 1921

References

Dorcaschematini
Beetles described in 1873